The kingdom of Agwe (aka the Ewe state of Agwe) was an African state created by the Ewe ethnic group in the territory of present-day Benin and Togo, in 1812. It had territories that were divided between France and Germany. France established the protectorate in 1895, and Germany in 1896. The kingdom was abolished but the two powers eventually considered their reestablishment in 1901. The kingdom was definitively abolished in 1949.

List of rulers of the Ewe state of Agwe

Sources
 Traditional polities
 Worldstatesmen, by Ben Cahoon

See also
Benin
Togo
Ewe states
Lists of office-holders

Agwe
Lists of African rulers
Togo-related lists
Former monarchies of Africa
Kingdoms of Benin